Eric Rosenthal may refer to:

Eric Rosenthal (activist), American activist, lawyer, and author
Eric Rosenthal (historian) (1905–1983), South African historian and author